Amerila rufitarsis is a moth of the subfamily Arctiinae. It was described by Walter Rothschild in 1917. It is found in Papua New Guinea (Umboi Island) and New Britain.

References

 , 1917: Some new moths of the families Arctiidae and Eupterotidae. Novitates Zoologicae 24 (3): 475–492.

Moths described in 1917
Amerilini
Moths of New Guinea